The 1961 New Mexico Lobos football team represented the University of New Mexico in the Skyline Conference during the 1961 NCAA University Division football season.  In their second season under head coach Bill Weeks, the Lobos compiled a 7–4 record (3–3 against Skyline opponents), finished in a tie for third place in the conference, and outscored opponents by a total of 215 to 197.  The Lobos concluded their season with a victory over Western Michigan in the inaugural Aviation Bowl, played in snow and sleet at Dayton, Ohio.

The team's statistical leaders included Jim Cromartie with 533 passing yards, Bobby Santiago with 535 rushing yards, and Larry Jasper with 161 receiving yards.

Schedule

References

New Mexico
New Mexico Lobos football seasons
New Mexico Lobos football